This page shows the results of the 2004 Centrobasket Championship for Women, which was held in the city of Guatemala City, Guatemala from July 27 to July 31, 2004.

Preliminary round

Bracket

Final standings

References
FIBA Archives
Results

Centrobasket Women
2004–05 in North American basketball
2004 in women's basketball
2004 in Guatemalan sport
International sports competitions hosted by Guatemala
2004 in Central American sport
2004 in Caribbean sport